Rowland Walpole Loane (died 8 October 1844), a merchant descended from a family of English landlords, was an early settler in New South Wales. Concerned more with his personal wealth than contributing to colonial society, Loane became well-known within the colony for his unscrupulous actions and unceasing litigation.

Early life and career
Loane was descended from a family of English landlords residing in the south of Ireland. He claimed he had been a naval officer, but his name does not appear in any naval records.

Life in New South Wales
Loane arrived in Hobart Town in 1809 in his own ship, Union, with a cargo of goods valued at £20,000. He sold the ship and its cargo to begin business as a general merchant. He was an active and successful merchant in Hobart, but drew criticism for letting his cattle damage his neighbours' crops on the assumption that the beasts could not be driven to the pound.

In 1813, Loane commissioned the building of the 133-ton [brig] Campbell Macquarie and moved it to Sydney where he operated as a merchant trader. In Sydney, Loane purchased Birchgrove House and leased land on the Balmain estate.

In 1818, Loane traveled from Sydney to India, and returned to Hobart Town the following year with cargo. During his absence from Hobart Town, the destruction of his account books prevented the collection of large debts owed to him. This experience was perhaps the catalyst leading to his contempt for the colonial government. Before departing for Sydney in 1813, he had bought a fifty-acre (20 ha) farm near Hobart, and leased it back to the original owner. On his return, he found that the tenant leasing his property had died, the land had been fenced for government purposes and the public was using a quarry on his property. He protested to the colonial government, but was never able to recover the documents proving his ownership and, after a prolonged argument with the authorities, he lost his case.

Loane had a land grant at Pittwater and after 1818 purchased several areas in the country, including one at Eastern Marshes in the Oatlands district, and a number of small areas in Hobart, on which he built houses which he let to government officers.

On another trip to India in 1823, Loane returned with a "Woman of Colour", named Madame D'Hotman, whom he had found in extreme poverty in Calcutta. She was said to have been his mistress. Later, eager to extricate himself from this woman, he tried to persuade her to return to her husband in Mauritius, but she claimed that he had given her his estate. When she died in 1831 her daughter claimed the property. He fought to regain the estate, all the way to England, but without success.

In 1825, Loane returned to Sydney, built a new residence and acquired land in the town area. In 1927, he returned to Europe and was married in Ireland in 1828 to Mary Lee, daughter of a colonel of the Royal Marines. In 1830, he sailed for Hobart Town with his wife and made his home on his property at Eastern Marshes, which he named Lee Mount. In 1834, he sold this property after another argument with the colonial government. He briefly returned to England in 1839 to unsuccessfully challenge the colonial government, before returning to Hobart Town in 1841.

He died in Hobart Town on 8 October 1844.

Litigious attitude
Throughout his life, Loane believed that he had been robbed by unscrupulous persons and officials and that to progress in such a community he had to use the same system which attacked him. He proceeded to vent his grievances though the court systems of New South Wales and England.

According to Lieutenant-Governor William Sorell:

Loane was a person who always asserts that he is ill-used by the world collectively and individually. His hand is against everyone and everyone against him. Not a man in the colony would, I believe, rely upon his word or engagement for the most trifling thing.

In 1834, Loane claimed, without evidence, that Lieutenant-Governor George Arthur had a personal grievance against him and encouraged the pound-keepers and police to take his cattle. He took his complaints to England and prosecuted in person, displaying rancour, exaggeration and disregard of evidence which did not impress the Colonial Office.

Arrogant and completely absorbed with the promotion of his fortune, Loane became well known in the colony for his unscrupulous actions and litigation. He did not participate in any cultural societies that flourished in the community, nor was his name associated with the popular movements of the time.

Books
 Historical Records of Australia, Series III, vols 2-3
 Correspondence file under Loane (Archives Office of Tasmania)
 Arthur papers (State Library of New South Wales)

External links
 F. C. Green: "Loane, Roland Walpole (?–1844)" in Australian Dictionary of Biography
 Court record
 Court record
 Merchants list

Year of birth missing
1844 deaths
Settlers of Australia
Australian ship owners